Chris Vargas (born January 29, 1971) is an American former gridiron football quarterback. He played in the Canadian Football League (CFL) for the Edmonton Eskimos, BC Lions and Winnipeg Blue Bombers. He played college football for the  Nevada Wolf Pack.

Biography
Vargas played for Nevada in the 1990 NCAA Division I-AA Football Championship Game, where the Wolf Pack lost to Georgia Southern, 36–13. He was then the starting quarterback for Nevada during the 1991 through 1993 seasons. 

Vargas went undrafted in the 1994 NFL Draft, and went on to play in the Canadian Football League (CFL). In 1997, he took over as starting quarterback for Winnipeg. He retired after the 1998 season.

In 2000, Vargas donated part of his lungs to his brother-in-law.

See also
 List of NCAA major college football yearly passing leaders
 List of NCAA major college football yearly total offense leaders

References

External links
Nevada Wolfpack bio

1971 births
Living people
American football quarterbacks
Canadian football quarterbacks
Nevada Wolf Pack football players
Edmonton Elks players
BC Lions players
Winnipeg Blue Bombers players